The Autumnal Mother (Persian: مادر پاییزی, romanized: Madare-h Paeizi) is a 2012 Iranian drama film written and directed by Sirous Ranjbar.

Plot 
Saeed, whose wife is missing, has never been in love. His son has autism. A nurse enters the house in the presence of Saeed.

Cast  
 Hanieh Tavassoli as Sareh 
 Alireza Jalali-tabar as Saeed
Vahid Rahbani
Behnaz Jafari
Arash Tajtehrani 
Mokhtar Saeghi 
Katayoun Karaei

References

External links 
 

2012 drama films
2012 films
Iranian drama films